Lethe appalachia, known generally as the Appalachian brown or Appalachian eyed brown, is a species of brush-footed butterfly in the family Nymphalidae. It is found in North America.

The MONA or Hodges number for Lethe appalachia is 4569.

See Satyrodes appalachia at Wikipedia for more Lethe appalachia information.

(Satyrodes = older genus name)

Subspecies
These two subspecies belong to the species Lethe appalachia:
 Lethe appalachia appalachia R. Chermock, 1947 i g
 Lethe appalachia leeuwi Gatrelle and Arbogast, 1974 i g
Data sources: i = ITIS, c = Catalogue of Life, g = GBIF, b = Bugguide.net

References

Further reading

External links

 

appalachia
Articles created by Qbugbot
Butterflies described in 1947